Count Adolf I of Nassau-Siegen (1362 – 12 June 1420), was since 1388 Count of Diez, through his first marriage. With his brothers, he succeeded his father in 1416 as Count of Nassau-Siegen (a part of the County of Nassau), and also inherited the County of Vianden in 1417. He descended from the Ottonian Line of the House of Nassau.

Biography
Adolf was born in 1362 as the eldest son of Count John I of Nassau-Siegen and Countess .

Adolf succeeded his father-in-law Count Gerhard VII of Diez as Count of Diez. Roman King Wenceslaus invested him with the county. As Count of Diez, Adolf build .

With his brothers, John II ʻwith the Helmetʼ, Engelbert I and John III ʻthe Youngerʼ, Adolf succeeded his father in 1416 as Count of Nassau-Siegen. They had already agreed on a joint continuation of the government on 21 December 1409. Whichever of the brothers would be native or closest to his lands on the fatherʼs death should take possession of them in all brothersʼ name until a division would have taken place. Whoever would take something for himself alone would be disinherited. All parental decrees favouring one brother over the other were declared null and void in advance. Adolf hereby tacitly renounced his right to the part of Nassau-Hadamar and the districts of Herborn, Haiger and Löhnberg, which he could have claimed in advance from the marriage contract with the heiress of the County of Diez. In accordance with this agreement, the brothers took over the government jointly after their fatherʼs death in 1416. However, the intended division did not take place: Adolf had no male offspring, the elder John was not married, the younger of the same name was a clergyman; it was to be expected that a division would not last long. Together, the brothers bought back the other half of the city of Siegen from the Electorate of Cologne.

When Elisabeth of Sponheim-Kreuznach, Countess of Vianden, died without issue in 1417, the four brothers, grandsons of Adelaide of Vianden, Elisabethʼs great-aunt, inherited the County of Vianden with the lordships of St. Vith, Bütgenbach, Dasburg and Grimbergen.

Adolf died on 12 June 1420. He was succeeded as Count of Diez by his son-in-law Godfrey VII of Eppstein-Münzenberg in one half and by his brothers in the other half. His brothers also succeeded Adolf as Count of Nassau-Siegen and Count of Vianden, dividing the County of Nassau-Siegen.

Marriages and issue

First marriage
Adolf married in 1384 to Countess Jutta of Diez (after 1367 – 14 August 1397), daughter of Count Gerhard VII of Diez and Countess Gertrud of Westerburg.
From the marriage of Adolf and Jutta only one daughter was born:
 Jutta (d. 2 August 1424), married in 1401 to Lord Godfrey VII of Eppstein-Münzenberg (d. 28 June 1437), since 1420 Count of half Diez.

Second marriage
Adolf remarried before 25 February 1401 to Kunigunde of Isenburg-Limburg (d. 11 June 1401/1402), daughter of John II of Isenburg, Lord of Limburg and Countess Hildegard of Saarwerden. The marriage remained childless.

Illegitimate child
Adolf had one illegitimate son:
 Johann von Diez, was a canon in Diez.

Ancestors

Notes

References

Sources
 
 
 
 
 
  (1882). Het vorstenhuis Oranje-Nassau. Van de vroegste tijden tot heden (in Dutch). Leiden: A.W. Sijthoff/Utrecht: J.L. Beijers.

External links
 Nassau. In: Medieval Lands. A prosopography of medieval European noble and royal families, by Charles Cawley.
 Nassau Part 4. In: An Online Gotha, by Paul Theroff.

|-

Nassau-Siegen, Adolf 01
Nassau-Siegen, Adolf 01
Counts of Diez
Counts of Nassau
Counts of Vianden
House of Nassau-Siegen
14th-century German nobility
15th-century German nobility